Angela Mary Doyle, AO (born Kathleen Doyle) is member of the Order of the Sisters of Mercy in Australia and is nationally recognised for her work as a hospital administrator at the Mater Misericordiae Hospital, Brisbane and for her early advocacy for the support and care of Queenslanders with HIV/AIDS.

She is the recipient of numerous awards and honours including: Queenslander of the Year in 1989, Australian Achiever in 1990, Order of Australia for services to hospital administration, community health and teaching health care services in 1993, the inaugural Queensland Greats award in 2001 and the Centenary Medal for distinguished service to the community and the health industry in 2001. 

In 2009, she was inducted into the Queensland Business Leaders Hall of Fame.

In 2010, Sister Angela Mary published her autobiography, Mercy, Mater & Me: Sister Angela Mary (A Memoir), with the University of Queensland Press.

References

Australian hospital administrators
Officers of the Order of Australia
Living people
Year of birth missing (living people)
Queensland Greats